Chernihiv Museum of Ukrainian Antiquities (Ukrainian: Чернігівський музей українських старожитностей) – museum in Chernigov, which existed in 1902-1925. It is located just beside the Chernihiv Stadium in st. Shevchenko, 63, Chernihiv, 14027 Ukraine.

History 
For the needs of the museum in 1900-1901, a building on the outskirts of Chernigov was rebuilt and reequipped, where the craft class of the orphanage was located. This building is known as the house of V. V. Tarnovsky.

The museum was opened in 1902 by the Chernihiv provincial zemstvo council on the basis of the museum and archival relics of the collection of V. V. Tarnovsky bequeathed to it.

Under Soviet rule, the exhibits of the museum replenished the expositions and funds of the State Taras Shevchenko Museum in Kyiv. The collection of autographs was transferred to the Department of Manuscripts of the Institute of Literature named after T. G. Shevchenko of the Academy of Sciences of the Ukrainian SSR. Other materials are now stored in the Chernihiv Regional Historical Museum named after V. V. Tarnovsky.

Now the house of the former museum houses the Chernihiv Regional Library for Youth.

On or about 10-11 March 2022 the library was heavily damaged, possibly due to the point of destruction, by Russian forces as part of their war of irredentist aggression against Ukraine

Description
The most valuable part of V. V. Tarnovsky's collection was Shevchenkiada, which consisted of 758 exhibits. Among them are 18 original letters from Taras Shevchenko, about 30 autographs of works (in particular, "Schodennik"), over 20 personal documents of the poet. The collection included more than 80 letters and records about Shevchenko's funeral, his personal belongings (an easel, a mastbel, a palette, painting and engraving equipment, a chair, a bottle, a shirt, etc.), a death mask and a finger with his hair, about 400 works by Shevchenko (among them there are 285 drawings and paintings, two albums with 50 watercolors, 38 engravings), 200 examples of Shevchenko's iconography, a collection of publications of his works and publications about him (248 items). In 1907, the museum received the poet's autographs from the archives of the "Third Department", among them the manuscript collection - "Three Lita" ("Three Summers").

Transport connections
 There are many connection to the stadium from Krasna Square that stop just beside the stadium.
 There are buses from the main Chernihiv–Ovruch railway train station or taxi just outside the station.

Gallery

References

External links
Official Website

Libraries in Ukraine
Education in Chernihiv
Library buildings completed in 1902
Art museums and galleries in Ukraine
Libraries in Chernihiv
Museums in Chernihiv